"Hollywood Divorce" is a song by the American hip-hop duo OutKast, featuring Lil Wayne and Snoop Dogg on guest vocals. It was released on November 7, 2006 as the fourth single from their album Idlewild.

It is one of the three songs from the album that both members of OutKast appear on, along with "Mighty 'O'" and "PJ & Rooster". The single peaked at number 20 on the US Billboard Bubbling Under R&B/Hip-Hop Singles chart.

Track listings
UK CD single
 "Hollywood Divorce" (main version) – 5:23
 "Hollywood Divorce" (clean version) – 5:23
 "Hollywood Divorce" (instrumental) – 5:23

12" vinyl single
 "Hollywood Divorce" (main version) – 5:23
 "Hollywood Divorce" (main version instrumental) – 5:23
 "Hollywood Divorce" (clean version) – 5:23
 "Hollywood Divorce" (clean version instrumental) – 5:23

Charts

References

2006 singles
Outkast songs
Lil Wayne songs
Snoop Dogg songs
Songs written by Lil Wayne
Songs written by Snoop Dogg
Songs written by André 3000
Songs written by Big Boi